Alberto Lembo (28 July 1944 – 22 February 2022) was an Italian politician. A member of the Lega Nord and later the National Alliance, he served in the Chamber of Deputies from 1994 to 2001. He died in Lonigo on 22 February 2022, at the age of 77.

References

1944 births
2022 deaths
20th-century Italian journalists
20th-century Italian politicians
21st-century Italian journalists
21st-century Italian politicians
Deputies of Legislature XII of Italy
Deputies of Legislature XIII of Italy
Lega Nord politicians
National Alliance (Italy) politicians
University of Padua alumni
People from the Province of Verona